Edward Joseph "Terrible Ted" Green (March 23, 1940 – October 8, 2019) was a Canadian professional ice hockey coach and player. Green played defence in the National Hockey League (NHL) for the Boston Bruins and in the World Hockey Association (WHA) for the New England Whalers and Winnipeg Jets, and was noted for his physical play. Green served as a head coach with the Edmonton Oilers, and was an assistant coach with the Oilers and the New York Rangers.

Playing career
Green played junior hockey in Manitoba for the Winnipeg Braves, winning the Memorial Cup in the 1958–59 season. He was originally the property of the Montreal Canadiens, but was claimed by the Bruins in the summer of 1960 and was called up for good in the 1961–62 season. He played ten seasons for Boston, gaining a reputation as a hard-hitting defensive defenceman, as well as one for violent play, and was a bulwark on the blue line when the Bruins emerged from being at the bottom of the league to becoming a powerhouse in the late 1960s. He was named to play in the All-Star Game in 1965 and 1969.

Coming off his best season in 1969 (for which he was named to the Second All-Star Team), Green was involved in an infamous incident in an exhibition game in Ottawa versus the St. Louis Blues on September 21, 1969, engaging in a bloody stick fight with Blues' forward Wayne Maki. Green was struck in the head, suffering a fractured skull and brain damage. He missed the entire regular season and playoffs, during which Boston won the Stanley Cup. Maki and Green were both charged with assault as a result of the incident, the first time NHL players faced charges as a result of on-ice violence; both were acquitted. Green was suspended by the NHL for 13 games. Though Green did not officially win the Cup, his teammates gave him his share of the prize money, and his name was also engraved on the Stanley Cup in 1970.

He returned the following season to play two more years with Boston (and played for the 1972 Cup winning team) before jumping to the upstart New England Whalers in the WHA, being named their first captain and leading the team to the WHA's inaugural league championship. After three seasons with the Whalers, he was traded to the Winnipeg Jets, with whom he finished his playing career in 1979.

Green ended his playing career with 254 points and 1029 penalty minutes in 620 games (NHL) and 180 points and 304 penalty minutes in 452 games (WHA). He ranked 17th all-time in games played in the WHA.

Coaching career
After his retirement, Green coached the intermediate Carman Hornets to a provincial title in 1979–80. He then joined the Edmonton Oilers as an assistant coach under close friend Glen Sather, who had played alongside him in Boston from 1967 to 1969. He won five more cups in 1984, 1985, 1987, 1988, 1990 (7 in total). He was named head coach of the Oilers in 1991, just as the Oilers' 1980s championship years were ending, though he led the team to the conference finals in 1992. With the Oilers' dynasty disintegrating, they missed the playoffs altogether in 1993—the first time they had been out of the postseason as an NHL team. Following a slow start in the 1993–94 NHL season, Sather fired Green 24 games into the season.

Death
Green died in Edmonton on October 8, 2019, after a long illness.

Awards and achievements 
Memorial Cup Championship (1959)
NHL Second All-Star Team (1969)
Played in NHL All-Star Game (1965 & 1969)
Stanley Cup Championship (1970, 1972) as a player
Stanley Cup Championship (1984, 1985, 1987, 1988) as Assistant Coach, (1990) Co-Coach.
Avco Cup Championships (1973, 1976, & 1978)
Inducted into the Manitoba Sports Hall of Fame and Museum in 2003
Honoured Member of the Manitoba Hockey Hall of Fame
Inaugural member of the World Hockey Association Hall of Fame

Career statistics

Regular season and playoffs

Coaching record

References

External links

Ted Green’s biography at Manitoba Sports Hall of Fame and Museum
Ted Green's biography at Manitoba Hockey Hall of Fame

1940 births
2019 deaths
Boston Bruins players
Canadian ice hockey coaches
Canadian ice hockey defencemen
Edmonton Oilers coaches
Ice hockey people from Manitoba
Kingston Frontenacs (EPHL) players
National Hockey League assistant coaches
New England Whalers players
New York Rangers coaches
St. Boniface Canadiens players
Stanley Cup champions
Winnipeg Jets (WHA) players
Winnipeg Warriors (minor pro) players